Ben Yuen (born 12 February 1964) is a Hong Kong actor.

Yuen began his film career in 1995. He won the Golden Horse Award for Best Supporting Actor in 2018. He was nominated in the Golden Horse Award for Best Leading Actor the following year.

Selected filmography
Raging Fire (2021)
Suk Suk (2019)
Tracey (2018)
Trivisa (2016)
Helios (2015)
Overheard 3 (2014)
Rule No. 1 (2008)
Confession of Pain (2006)
Bullets of Love (2001)
Fighting for Love (2001)
King of Comedy (1999)
A True Mob Story (1998)

References

1964 births
Living people
Hong Kong male film actors
20th-century Hong Kong male actors
21st-century Hong Kong male actors